Friar Benito Jerónimo Feijóo y Montenegro (8 October 167626 September 1764) was a Spanish monk and scholar who led the Age of Enlightenment in Spain.  He was an energetic popularizer noted for encouraging scientific and empirical thought in an effort to debunk myths and superstitions.

Biography
He joined the Benedictine order at the age of 14, and had taken classes in Galicia, León, and Salamanca. He later taught theology and philosophy at the University, where he earned a professorship in theology.

He was appalled by the superstition and ignorance of his time, and his works aimed at combating the situation. His fame spread quickly throughout Europe. His revelations excited considerable opposition in certain quarters in Spain, for example from Salvador José Mañer and others; but the opposition was futile, and Feijóo's services to the cause of education and knowledge were universally recognized long before his death in Oviedo.

A century later Alberto Lista said that a monument should be erected to Feijóo, at the foot of which all his works should be burned. He was not a great genius, nor a writer of transcendent merit; his name is connected with no important discovery, but his literary style is clear and not without distinction. He tried to uproot many popular errors, awakened an interest in scientific methods, and is justly regarded as the initiator of educational reform in Spain.

Works
His two famous works, Teatro crítico universal (1726–1739) and Cartas eruditas y curiosas (1742–1760), are multi-volume collections of essays that cover a range of subjects, from natural history and the then known sciences, education, history, religion, literature, philology, philosophy and medicine, down to superstitions, wonders and salient points of contemporary journalistic interest. In the edition of 1777 they occupy nine and five volumes respectively, to which three supplementary volumes must be added. A reprint occurs in volume 56 of the Biblioteca de autores españoles, with an introduction by Vicente de la Fuente. As learning advanced, his writings were relatively relegated to a place of historical and literary interest. The majority of his works were translated into English by Captain John Brett (3 vols., 1777-1780).

Footnotes

References
 

Age of Enlightenment
Writers from Galicia (Spain)
18th-century Spanish people
People from Ourense (comarca)
Spanish Benedictines
Spanish essayists
Spanish male writers
Academic staff of the University of Oviedo
1676 births
1764 deaths
Male essayists
University of Salamanca alumni
Academic staff of the University of Salamanca